A. polymorpha may refer to:

 Actinoseris polymorpha, a plant native to Brazil
 Adelieledone polymorpha, a cephalopod mollusc
 Amphiroa polymorpha, a thalloid alga
 Amphisphaeria polymorpha, a fungus with perithecial fruiting bodies
 Amyris polymorpha, a plant endemic to Cuba
 Anomis polymorpha, an owlet moth
 Apodochloris polymorpha, a green alga
 Asperitas polymorpha, a land snail
 Azteca polymorpha, a Neotropical ant